In military terms, 108th Division or 108th Infantry Division may refer to:

 108th Division (People's Republic of China)
 108th Infantry Division (German Empire)
 108th Division (Imperial Japanese Army)
 108th Division (United States)

sl:Seznam divizij po zaporednih številkah (100. - 149.)#108. divizija